The North and South Women's Amateur Golf Championship is an annual golf tournament held since 1903 at the Pinehurst Resort in Pinehurst, North Carolina. An invitational tournament, participants are chosen based upon their performance in national amateur championships and overall competitive record.

Winners

2022 Emilia Migliaccio
2021 Gina Kim
2020 Rachel Kuehn
2019 Gabriela Ruffels
2018 Stephanie Lau
2017 Isabella Fierro
2016 Kristen Gillman
2015 Bailey Tardy
2014 Alison Lee
2013 Ally McDonald
2012 Austin Ernst
2011 Danielle Kang
2010 Cydney Clanton
2009 Amelia Lewis
2008 Kristie Smith
2007 Alison Walshe
2006 Jenny Suh
2005 Yani Tseng
2004 Morgan Pressel
2003 Brittany Lang
2002 May Wood
2001 Meredith Duncan
2000 Candy Hannemann
1999 Beth Bauer
1998 Beth Bauer
1997 Kerry Postillon
1996 Kristen Samp
1995 Laura Philo
1994 Stephanie Neill
1993 Emilee Klein
1992 Stephanie Sparks
1991 Kelly Robbins
1990 Brandie Burton
1989 Page Marsh
1988 Donna Andrews
1987 Carol Semple Thompson
1986 Leslie Shannon
1985 Lee Ann Hammack
1984 Susan Pager
1983 Anne Quast Sander
1982 Anne Quast Sander
1981 Patti Rizzo
1980 Charlotte Montgomery
1979 Julie Gumlia
1978 Cathy Sherk
1977 Marcia Dolan
1976 Carol Semple
1975 Cynthia Hill
1974 Marlene Stewart
1973 Beth Barry
1972 Jane Bastanchury Booth
1971 Barbara McIntire
1970 Hollis Stacy
1969 Barbara McIntire
1968 Alice Dye
1967 Phyllis Preuss
1966 Nancy Roth Syms
1965 Barbara McIntire
1964 Phyllis Preuss
1963 Nancy Roth
1962 Clifford Ann Creed
1961 Barbara McIntire
1960 Barbara McIntire
1959 Ann Casey Johnstone
1958 Carolyn Cudone
1957 Barbara McIntire
1956 Marlene Stewart
1955 Wiffi Smith
1954 Joyce Ziske
1953 Pat O'Sullivan
1952 Barbara Romack
1951 Pat O'Sullivan
1950 Pat O'Sullivan
1949 Peggy Kirk
1948 Louise Suggs
1947 Babe Zaharias
1946 Louise Suggs
1945 Estelle Lawson Page
1944 Estelle Lawson Page
1943 Dorothy Kirby
1942 Louise Suggs
1941 Estelle Lawson Page
1940 Estelle Lawson Page
1939 Estelle Lawson Page
1938 Jane Cothran
1937 Estelle Lawson Page
1936 Deborah Verry
1935 Estelle Lawson
1934 Charlotte Glutting
1933 Maureen Orcutt
1932 Maureen Orcutt
1931 Maureen Orcutt
1930 Glenna Collett
1929 Glenna Collett
1928 Opal Hill
1927 Glenna Collett
1926 Louise Fordyce
1925 Mrs. Melville Jones
1924 Glenna Collett
1923 Glenna Collett
1922 Glenna Collett
1921 Dorothy Campbell
1920 Dorothy Campbell
1919 Nonna Barlow
1918 Dorothy Campbell
1917 Elaine Rosenthal
1916 Nonna Barlow
1915 Nonna Barlow
1914 Florence Harvey
1913 Lillian B. Hyde
1912 Mrs. J. Raymond Price
1911 Louise Elkins
1910 Florence Vanderbeck
1909 Mary Fownes
1908 Julia R. Mix
1907 Molly B. Adams
1906 Myra D. Paterson
1905 Houghton Dutton
1904 Myra D. Paterson
1903 Myra D. Paterson

Source:

See also
North and South Men's Amateur Golf Championship
North and South Open

References

External links

Amateur golf tournaments in the United States
Women's golf tournaments in the United States
Women's sports in North Carolina
Golf in North Carolina